The International Diversion Dam (or simply the International Dam) is a diversion dam on the Rio Grande in Ciudad Juárez.  The dam is operated by the International Boundary and Water Commission, and diverts water into the Acequia Madre for use in irrigation in Mexico.
Water is diverted under the terms of the 1906 treaty on usage of Rio Grande water between the United States and Mexico.

Origins

The dam has its origins in the 21 May 1906 treaty between the United States and Mexico for "an equitable distribution of the waters of the Rio Grande."
This guaranteed Mexico up to  annually, with the Americans taking the rest, 
except in time of drought when the shares would be reduced on a percentage basis.
The International Dam at the head of the Acequia Madre was completed in 1918, and improvements to the dam were completed in 1941.

American Dam

To ensure that they got their agreed share, in 1935 Congress authorized construction of the American Dam, 
Beyond the ruins at Fort Quitman the Rio Grande riverbed is often dry until the confluence of the Rio Conchos.

Future possibilities

The dam is part of the Rio Grande Rectification Project.
Between 1997 and 1998 a cement-lined extension to the American Canal replaced part of the earthen Franklin Canal, which delivered water through the City of El Paso to farms in El Paso’s Lower Valley.
During planning for the extension, the Mexicans expressed interest in having their  allotment delivered from the end of the RGACE near Riverside Dam, rather than to the International Dam at the head of the Acequia Madre, as at present.
The water would be delivered via a siphon underneath the Rio Grande.

References
Citations

Sources

 

Dams in Mexico
Dams completed in 1918
Dams on the Rio Grande
1918 establishments in Mexico